The 2015 NASCAR Sprint All-Star Race (XXXI) was a NASCAR Sprint Cup Series stock car race held on May 16, 2015 at Charlotte Motor Speedway in Concord, North Carolina. Contested over 110 laps, it was the second exhibition race of the 2015 Sprint Cup Series season.

Report

Background

Race winners from the previous season through the 2015 SpongeBob SquarePants 400 at Kansas Speedway, and all previous All-Star race winners and Sprint Cup champions who had attempted to qualify for every race in 2015 were eligible to compete in the All-Star Race. For the first time since the 2002 All-Star Race, the Sprint Showdown was split into multiple segments, with the winners of each 20-lap segment advancing to compete in the race, as well as the Sprint fan vote winner. The All-Star Race was 110 laps long, separated into five segments: four segments of 25 laps and a final segment of ten laps. A mandatory pit stop was between the final two segments, while pitting between the 25 lap segments was optional. A minimum of 20 drivers took part of the All-Star Race. Seventeen were automatically in the race while three got in via the Showdown. Kyle Busch, who was not expected to return to racing until Independence Day weekend at Daytona International Speedway, announced - via a video on Twitter - that he was coming back for the All-Star Race.  Busch had been injured in a support series race in February and had missed the entire season up to that point.

Entry list

Sprint Showdown

The entry list for the Sprint Showdown was released on Tuesday, May 12 at 10:04 a.m. Eastern time. Thirty drivers were entered for the race, but Travis Kvapil's entry was withdrawn before the race.

Sprint All-Star Race
The entry list for the All-Star Race was released that same day at 11:03 a.m. Seventeen cars were automatically entered for the race. Jeff Gordon started his 22nd and final All-Star Race.

Practice

Sprint Showdown practice

All-Star Race practice
"I was excited to get back in here, see my guys and get the taste of all that again," Busch said. "Everything went according to plan and we had some decent speed in race trim. We're excited and hopefully, we can see that speed again tomorrow night."

Qualifying (Showdown)

Qualifying results (Showdown)

Sprint Showdown

Segment One
The race was scheduled to start at 7:15 p.m., but started at 7:25 p.m. when Paul Menard led the field to the green flag. He didn't get a good start and Greg Biffle easily took the lead. Biffle pulled away from the field on his way to winning the first segment with relative ease. The first caution of the race flew on lap 21 to end the segment. Clint Bowyer assumed the lead with Biffle advancing to the All-Star Race. He lost the lead, however, on pit road to David Ragan.

Segment Two
Martin Truex Jr. jumped to the lead with 20 laps to go on the restart. The second caution of the race flew for a one car spin in turn 4. Exiting 4, J. J. Yeley got loose and spun through the grass on the front stretch. Unlike in the first segment, only green flag laps count. Only one car opted to pit under the caution.

The race restarted with 18 laps to go. Kyle Larson matched Truex the whole lap to take the lead off of turn 4. Clint Bowyer went three-wide for the lead with 16 laps to go. Larson got tapped by Sam Hornish Jr. in 3 and about tagged the wall in 4. He saved it, but brought the car down pit with eight laps to go and ending his chance of advancing to the All-Star Race. It was ultimately Clint Bowyer who would win to advance to the All-Star Race. Danica Patrick won the fan vote to advance to the All-Star Race. “I have great fans," Patrick said in a press release. "I know I didn’t make it in last year, but I heard that they voted even more last year than the year before that and so I’m sure that this year was nothing different. I think I got close at the end and they came through. They always come through. I am lucky to have such great fans."

Results

Qualifying (All-Star Race)
Like the Kansas race the previous week, the qualifying session started on Fox News Channel, due to a Major League Baseball game running long, the qualifying session went on Fox Sports 1 13 minutes later.

All-Star Race qualifying results

All-Star Race

Segment 1
The Sprint All-Star Race was scheduled to start at 9:16 p.m., but started at 9:42 p.m. when Denny Hamlin led the field to the green flag. He jumped to a lead of two seconds over Kasey Kahne in five laps. But by lap 10, Kahne has cut the gap to half a second. He finally passed Hamlin on the outside in turn 2 to take the lead on lap 16. Exiting turn 4, Greg Biffle slapped the wall with five laps to go in segment 1. He slammed the wall a second time in the final lap of the first segment. The first caution of the race flew on lap 26 to complete the first segment. While pitting in the first four segments is optional, all the cars opted to pit at the end of the first segment. Brad Keselowski exited pit road with the lead. To add to Biffle's woes, he was tagged for speeding on pit road and restarted the race from the tail-end of the field. The effect, however, was moot because he was already last in the running order.

Segment 2
The race restarted on lap 26. Dale Earnhardt Jr. spun the tires on the restart and just dropped like a rock down the running order. Kurt Busch got underneath Keselowski to briefly take the lead on lap 34. Keselowski would take back the lead the next lap. Busch attempted to go by him the next lap, but got loose exiting turn 2 and lost ground to him. While Kurt reeled in Brad down to three tenths of a second, Keselowski would cross the line first in the second segment. The second caution of the race flew to end segment 2. Once again, all the cars opted to pit under the caution. This time, Jamie McMurray left with the lead. Greg Biffle, Kyle Busch and Denny Hamlin were all tagged for speeding on pit road and restarted the race from the tail-end of the field.

Segment 3
The race restarted on lap 51. McMurray didn't get a good start and was about spun out by Joey Logano. This allowed teammate Brad Keselowski to retake the lead. Danica Patrick took her car to the garage on lap 60 after the left-front hub of her car burned out. Kyle Busch made an unscheduled stop for a tire vibration on lap 63. The culprit was a loose left-rear wheel. Kevin Harvick made a charge at the lead, but Brad Keselowski was able to lead the entire third segment as the third caution of the race flew to conclude segment 3. Everybody pitted under this caution. Matt Kenseth exited with the lead. Greg Biffle and Tony Stewart were tagged for speeding on pit road and Dale Earnhardt Jr. was tagged for his crew being over the wall too soon. All three restarted the race from the tail-end of the field.

Segment 4

The race restarted on lap 76. Denny Hamlin beat his teammate to take the lead on lap 77. He, however, was no match on two tires to Kurt Busch on four who took the lead on lap 78. He would hold the lead to the conclusion of the fourth segment as the fourth caution of the race flew. Brad Keselowski led the field down pit road for the mandatory four tire pit stop. Denny Hamlin exited with the lead. Carl Edwards and Brad Keselowski were tagged for speeding on pit road and restarted the race from the tail-end of the field.

10 laps to go
The race restarted with 10 laps to go. While Hamlin was unable to pull away from the field as had been the norm in the last few years, he was able to hold off a hard charging Kevin Harvick to score the victory in the Sprint All-Star Race. It was the fifth straight year that the winner of the race restarted either first or second in the final 10 laps. "In the middle part of the race, I thought we were out to lunch," Hamlin said. "With 50 (laps) to go, I didn’t see this coming. But the pit crew knocked it out of the park – a primetime, under-pressure performance that won us the race. Then, we had to hold off the "4" (Harvick), which we haven’t been able to do the last two years. Everything came together perfectly for that last 10 laps." Jeff Gordon finished fourth in his 22nd and final All-Star Race. Kyle Busch finished sixth in his first Sprint Cup Series race since Homestead last November. "I felt like I got of the car after 100 laps and I'm fine," Busch said. "Am I going to die out after 200 or 300? I don't know, but the plan is to the full distance." After restarting the race from the tail-end of the field, Brad Keselowski worked his way to a ninth-place finish.

All-Star Race results

Media

Television
Fox Sports covered their 15th All-Star Race. Mike Joy, Larry McReynolds and 1985 race winner Darrell Waltrip had the call in the booth for the race. Jamie Little, Chris Neville and Matt Yocum handled the pit road duties for the television side. Like Kansas, coverage was briefly moved to FOX News Channel due to MLB Coverage on Fox Sports 1 running long. This time, FOX News Channel broadcast the first few cars of qualifying. Once the MLB Game ended, both channels briefly simulcasted Qualifying until Kasey Kahne qualified. Coverage then switched to Fox Sports 1.

Radio
MRN has carried the All-Star Race since 1985 and had the radio call for the race, which was simulcast on Sirius XM NASCAR Radio. Joe Moore, Jeff Striegle and 1989 race winner Rusty Wallace called the race in the booth when the field was racing down the front stretch. Dave Moody called the race from a scaffold outside of turn 2 when the field was racing through turns 1 and 2. Kyle Rickey called the race from a billboard outside of turn 3 when the field was racing through turns 3 and 4. Alex Hayden, Winston Kelley and Steve Post worked pit road for MRN.

Note

References

Sprint All-Star Race
Sprint All-Star Race
NASCAR races at Charlotte Motor Speedway
NASCAR All-Star Race